Charles Ashmead Schaeffer (August 14, 1843 – September 23, 1898) was a chemist who served as the seventh President of the University of Iowa, serving from 1887 to 1898.

Early life
Schaeffer was born on August 14, 1843 in Harrisburg, Pennsylvania.  He was the son of Rev. Charles William Schaeffer, the prominent Lutheran clergyman, and Elizabeth Fry Ashmead Schaeffer.

Schaeffer graduated from the University of Pennsylvania in 1861. From 1863 to 1865, he studied at Lawrence Scientific School at Harvard University. He received his PhD from the University of Göttingen in 1868.

Career
From 1887 to 1898, Schaeffer served as the seventh President of the University of Iowa.

Personal life
Schaeffer was married to Evelyn Schuyler (1846–1942), the daughter of George W. Schuyler, who served as New York State Treasurer, and sister of Eugene Schuyler, the writer and diplomat. Together, they were the parents of four children, including:
 Elizabeth Ashmead Schaeffer (1872–1945)

Schaeffer died unexpectedly at the age of 55 in Iowa City, Iowa.

References

Further reading
Horton, Loren N. "Schaeffer, Charles Ashmead" The Biographical Dictionary of Iowa. University of Iowa Press, 2009. Accessed December 8, 2016

Presidents of the University of Iowa
1843 births
1898 deaths
19th-century American educators
Cornell University faculty